Paraburdoo Airport  is an airport serving Paraburdoo, a town in the Pilbara region of Western Australia. It also serves the town of Tom Price, with bus services completing the extra  to Tom Price.

The airport is owned by Rio Tinto Group and operated by Pilbara Iron. Paraburdoo's primary air traffic is made up by a mixture of Qantas and Virgin Australia flights, as well as general aviation light aircraft. Qantas operates 32 direct flights weekly to and from Perth. Virgin Australia operate two Perth direct flights per week, with two closed charter flights weekly to Carnarvon and Geraldton.

Runways 
Runway: 06/24
Dimensions: 
Surface: Asphalt
True heading: 245.0
Latitude: 23° 10' 02.54" S
Longitude 117° 45' 22.97" E
Elevation: 
Slope: -0.4°
Landing distance: 
Takeoff distance:

Lighting System
 Pilot Controlled Lighting (PCL)
 Low Intensity Runway Lights (LIRL)
 Precision Approach Path Indicator (PAPI)
 Portable

Airlines and destinations

Statistics

Incidents 
 On 17 June 2007 a twin-engine charter aircraft had a fault with its landing gear and was forced to circle for over two hours before making an emergency landing on Paraburdoo's runway. The incident required a cleanup of the runway as well as cranes to remove the aircraft. A QantasLink Boeing 717 from Perth to Paraburdoo was forced to divert to Newman Airport.

Statistics 
Paraburdoo Airport was ranked 34th in Australia for the number of revenue passengers served in financial year 2010–2011.

See also 
 List of airports in Western Australia
 Aviation transport in Australia

References

External links

 Airservices Aerodromes & Procedure Charts

Pilbara airports
Rio Tinto Iron Ore
Shire of Ashburton